William A. Sickner (1890–1967) was an American cinematographer. He worked prolifically in film and later television. He worked for a number of studios, particularly Universal and Monogram Pictures.

Selected filmography

 Stormy (1935)
 Rustlers of Red Dog (1935)
 Left-Handed Law (1937)
 Smoke Tree Range (1937)
 The Oregon Trail (1939)
 Black Diamonds (1940)
 Boss of Bullion City (1940)
 Hot Steel (1940)
 Winners of the West (1940)
 Riders of Death Valley (1941)
 Sea Raiders (1941)
 Gang Busters (1942)
 Frontier Badmen (1943)
 Keep 'Em Slugging (1943
 The Lone Star Trail (1943)
 Mystery of the River Boat (1944)
 The Great Alaskan Mystery (1944)
 Week-End Pass (1944)
 Trigger Trail (1944)
 Oklahoma Raiders (1944)
 The Mummy's Ghost (1944)
 Saddle Serenade (1945)
 Penthouse Rhythm (1945)
 The Lonesome Trail (1945)
 Riders of the Dawn (1945)
 Bowery Bombshell (1946)
 Don't Gamble with Strangers (1946)
 In Fast Company (1946)
 Live Wires (1946)
 Killer Dill (1947)
 King of the Bandits (1947)
 Robin Hood of Monterey (1947)
 Gas House Kids Go West (1947)
 Louisiana (1947)
 Joe Palooka in the Knockout (1947)
 Docks of New Orleans (1948)
 Kidnapped (1948)
 French Leave (1948)
 Tuna Clipper (1949)
 Trail of the Yukon (1949)
 The Wolf Hunters (1949)
 Hold That Baby! (1949)
 Killer Shark (1950)
 Call of the Klondike (1950)
 Snow Dog (1950)
 Square Dance Katy (1950)
 Father Makes Good (1950)
 Father Takes the Air (1951)
 Northwest Territory (1951)
 Yukon Manhunt (1951)
 Casa Manana (1951)
 The Lion Hunters (1951)
 Yellow Fin (1951)
 Desert Pursuit (1952)
 Torpedo Alley (1952)
 Northern Patrol (1953)
 Jack Slade (1953)
 Fangs of the Arctic (1953)
 Tangier Incident (1953)
 Mexican Manhunt (1953)
 The Return of Jack Slade (1955)
 Night Freight (1955)
 The Undead (1957)

References

Bibliography
 Pitts, Michael R. Thrills Untapped: Neglected Horror, Science Fiction and Fantasy Films, 1928-1936. McFarland, 2018.

External links

1890 births
1967 deaths
American cinematographers
People from Rochester, New York